Kim Kyong-ok is a North Korean politician and four-star army general in the Korean People's Army. He is member of the Central Committee of the Workers' Party of Korea (WPK), first deputy director of the Organization and Guidance Department, and has served as member of the Supreme People's Assembly.

Biography
In 2008, he was appointed first vice-chairman of the Central Committee. Pursuant to the provisions of the 3rd Conference of the Workers' Party of Korea, on September 28, 2010, Kim Kyong-ok was appointed a member of the Central Military Commission of the Workers' Party of Korea, and also sat in the Central Committee for the first time. He was also promoted to a four-star general in September 2010 and is a general by appointment only, having no formal military experience.  In addition, he is the first deputy director of the Organization and Guidance Department at the Central Committee. He took this position in 2008. In the OGD, Kim is in charge of security for the Supreme Leader, thus he oversees activities of the Guards Command and the WPK Military Security Command.

Member of the Supreme People's Assembly, North Korea's unicameral parliament, from the 10th convocation.

After the death of Kim Jong-il in December 2011, Kim Kyong-ok was in 56th place in the 232-person Funeral Committee. In 2013 he was member of the funeral committee of Kim Kuk-thae. In 2015 he was ranked 36 in the funeral committee of Kim Yang-gon. In February 2012 he was awarded the Order of Kim Jong-il.

General Kim was sanctioned by the United States in 2016 and the United Nations in 2017 for human rights abuses.

References

North Korean generals
Workers' Party of Korea politicians